Pierce Manufacturing is a U.S. company based in Appleton, Wisconsin that manufactures customized fire and rescue apparatus and a wholly owned subsidiary of Oshkosh Corporation. Pierce was acquired by Oshkosh in 1996 and is currently the largest fire apparatus company in the US. The company was founded in 1913 by Humphrey Pierce and his son Dudley as the Pierce Auto Body Works Inc., and concentrated on building custom truck bodies for the Ford Model T. The first production facility was designed in 1917 and enlarged in 1918 by architect Wallace W. DeLong. From the 1960s to the early 1980s, Pierce was primarily known for building custom bodies on commercial and other manufacturer's custom chassis, and was considered an original equipment manufacturer (OEM).

Although the Arrow name was used for its first custom chassis which debuted in 1979, the company has no affiliation with George N. Pierce's famous Pierce-Arrow Motor Car Company of Buffalo, New York, which operated from 1901 to 1938. However, the Pierce-Arrow Motor Car Company coincidentally supplied 8- and 12-cylinder engines to Seagrave for use in their fire apparatus. These engines continued to be made even after Pierce-Arrow ceased operation in 1938. Seagrave continued to deliver fire apparatus with the "Pierce-Arrow" V-12 until 1970.

Throughout the years, Pierce has had partnerships with various other manufacturers, notably when it came to aerial devices (it now engineers and builds all its own aerial devices in-house). Such aerial manufacturers included Snorkel, Pitman, Aerial Innovations (AI), Ladder Towers Incorporated (LTI), Smeal, Bronto Skylift and Nova Quintech (whose assets Pierce/Oshkosh acquired in 1997). In addition to its main facilities in Wisconsin, it also has facilities in Bradenton, Florida. The Florida facility is a manufacturing site for the custom Saber chassis and Responder line of apparatus. Currently (December 4, 2017) Pierce is the largest manufacturer of firefighting apparatus in the United States. End-users are represented across a larger majority of the planet, including China. The single largest municipal fleet of Pierce Manufacturing apparatus is located within the 407 square miles of Fairfax County, Virginia. (Fairfax County Fire and Rescue Department)

In September 2021, Pierce acquired an ownership interest in fire engine manufacturer Boise Mobile Equipment (BME) of Boise, Idaho.

Products

Custom chassis

Discontinued 

 Arrow (1980–2002)
 Contender (1999–2010)
 Dash (1984–1999)
 Dash D-8000 (1988–1992)
 Dash 2000 (1999–2007)
 Dash CF (2011–2020)
 Enforcer (2000–2007; reintroduced in 2014)
 Javelin (1990–1993)
 Lance (1985–1993)
 Lance II (1993–1999)
 Lance 2000 (1999–2007)

Commercial chassis 
 Ford
 Freightliner
 Kenworth
 International
 Peterbilt

Apparatus 

 Rearmount and midmount steel aerial ladders
 Rearmount aluminum aerial ladders
 Rearmount and midmount steel aerial platforms
 Rearmount aluminum aerial platforms
 Tractor drawn steel aerial ladders
 Telescoping and/or articulating water tower booms
 Standard and rescue midmount pumpers
 Standard and rescue rearmount pumpers
 Pumper-tankers/tankers/tenders and elliptical tankers/tenders
 Mini pumpers
 Wildland/brush pumpers (Types 1 through 6)
 Walk-in and non-walk-in heavy rescues
 Walk-in and non-walk-in medium rescues
 Walk-in and non-walk-in light rescues
 Homeland security vehicles
 Command, communication, and rehab vehicles
 Foam proportioning systems
 Fire Patrol Trucks

Gallery

References

 Shapiro, L. Aerial Fire Trucks, Motorbooks International, June 2002. 
 Company History

Manufacturing companies based in Wisconsin
Fire service vehicle manufacturers
Motor vehicle manufacturers based in Wisconsin
Oshkosh Corporation
Truck manufacturers of the United States
Appleton, Wisconsin